The WMRA World Cup is an annual series of mountain running competitions organised by the World Mountain Running Association (WMRA) that runs from around May to October. Athletes are awarded points for each performance on the tour. Its predecessor was the Alpine Grand Prix, a 1997 formation including four European races in the Alps region. It formally became the WMRA Grand Prix in 1999 and subsequently expanded to six races in 2001. It reverted to four races in 2007 and from 2008 onwards began to vary between five and seven races. The competition took its current title World Cup in 2014.

History
The series originally was held mid-year around July to August, fitting mostly between the European Mountain Running Championships (held in early July) and the World Mountain Running Championships (held in mid-September).  From 2001 onwards, the expansion of the series meant the inclusion of the World Championships as a leg of the series (if held in Europe) and the Grand Prix Final event coming after the championships as a season-closer for mountain running. The races in the middle period of the series are usually held relatively close together to allow top level athletes from across the world to compete in many races without excessive travel. From 2006 onwards the International Association of Athletics Federations (IAAF) began sanctioning the meetings on the annual circuit.

The points scoring format is cumulative. Finishing positions in a WMRA Grand Prix race range from 100 points for first to 1 point for 30th. Additional points may be awarded for performances achieved at the World Championships, if that event is included in the tour that year, and the Grand Prix Final race. An athlete's four best performances across the series are totalled and the athlete with the highest overall score wins the series. The series has a men's division and a women's division, with both a men's and women's series winner being declared. Athletes must compete in at least two races in order to be considered in the final rankings.

Jonathan Wyatt of New Zealand is the most successful athlete of the series history, accumulating eight wins from 1999 to 2009. He is also the only male athlete to achieve a perfect score (winning all his races), having done so five times consecutively from 2002 to 2006. Angela Mudge of Great Britain and Poland's Izabela Zatorska are the joint most successful female runners across the series, each with three victories to their name. Zatorska became the first person to achieve a perfect score in the series in 2001. Anna Pichrtová (2006) and Andrea Mayr (2014) are the only other women to match that feat. Eritrean Azeria Teklay became the first winner from Africa in 2012, marking increased participation from outside the Western world.

The World Cup was cancelled in 2020. From 2022 World Cup Gold Label and Silver Label events are held.

Editions

Races
Numerous races have featured over the history of the competition, most of them being held in the Alps. Exceptions to this include the Gibraltar Rock Race in Gibraltar, the Snowdon Race in Wales, Skaala Uphill in Norway, and Alyeska Mountain Run in Alaska – the latter (included once in 2002) is the only occasion that a Grand Prix race has been held outside of Europe. The Šmarna Gora Mountain Race in Slovenia has served the honour of being the Grand Prix Final race on several occasions.

 Translates as Grintovec Mountain Race

References

External links
WMRA Mountain Running Grand Prix. GBR Athletics. Retrieved on 2015-03-24.
WMRA Grand Prix until 2013 /World Cup from 2014. WMRA. Retrieved on 2015-03-24.

Mountain running competitions
Recurring sporting events established in 1999
Athletics in Europe
Annual athletics series
World cups